Ribavirin, also known as tribavirin, is an antiviral medication used to treat RSV infection, hepatitis C and some viral hemorrhagic fevers. For hepatitis C, it is used in combination with other medications such as simeprevir, sofosbuvir, peginterferon alfa-2b or peginterferon alfa-2a. Among the viral hemorrhagic fevers it is used for Lassa fever, Crimean–Congo hemorrhagic fever, and Hantavirus infection but should not be used for Ebola or Marburg infections. Ribavirin is taken by mouth or inhaled.

Common side effects include feeling tired, headache, nausea, fever, muscle pains, and an irritable mood. Serious side effects include red blood cell breakdown, liver problems, and allergic reactions. Use during pregnancy results in harm to the baby. Effective birth control is recommended for both males and females for at least seven months during and after use. The mechanism of action of ribavirin is not entirely clear.

Ribavirin was patented in 1971 and approved for medical use in 1986. It is on the World Health Organization's List of Essential Medicines. It is available as a generic medication.

Medical uses
Ribavirin is used primarily to treat hepatitis C and viral hemorrhagic fevers (which is an orphan indication in most countries). In this former indication the oral (capsule or tablet) form of ribavirin is used in combination with pegylated interferon alfa, including in people coinfected with hepatitis B, HIV and in the pediatric population. Statins may improve this combination's efficacy in treating hepatitis C. Ribavirin is the only known treatment for a variety of viral hemorrhagic fevers, including Lassa fever, Crimean-Congo hemorrhagic fever, Venezuelan hemorrhagic fever, and Hantavirus infection, although data regarding these infections are scarce and the drug might be effective only in early stages. It is noted by the United States Army Medical Research Institute of Infectious Diseases (USAMRIID) that "Ribavirin has poor in vitro and in vivo activity against the filoviruses (Ebola and Marburg) and the flaviviruses (dengue, yellow fever, Omsk hemorrhagic fever, and Kyasanur forest disease)" The aerosol form has been used in the past to treat respiratory syncytial virus-related diseases in children, although the evidence to support this is rather weak.

It has been used (in combination with ketamine, midazolam, and amantadine) in treatment of rabies.

Experimental data indicate that ribavirin may have useful activity against canine distemper and poxviruses. Ribavirin has also been used as a treatment for herpes simplex virus. One small study found that ribavirin treatment reduced the severity of herpes outbreaks and promoted recovery, as compared with placebo treatment. Another study found that ribavirin potentiated the antiviral effect of acyclovir.

Some interest has been seen in its possible use as a treatment for cancers, especially acute myeloid leukemia.

Adverse effects 

The medication has two FDA "black box" warnings: One raises concerns that use before or during pregnancy by either sex may result in birth defects in the baby, and the other is regarding the risk of red blood cell breakdown.

Ribavirin should not be given with zidovudine because of the increased risk of anemia; concurrent use with didanosine should likewise be avoided because of an increased risk of mitochondrial toxicity.

Mechanisms of action
It is a guanosine (ribonucleic) analog used to stop viral RNA synthesis and viral mRNA capping, thus, it is a nucleoside inhibitor. Ribavirin is a prodrug, which when metabolized resembles purine RNA nucleotides. In this form, it interferes with RNA metabolism required for viral replication. Over five direct and indirect mechanisms have been proposed for its mechanism of action. The enzyme inosine triphosphate pyrophosphatase (ITPase) dephosphorylates ribavirin triphosphate in vitro to ribavirin monophosphate, and ITPase reduced enzymatic activity present in 30% of humans potentiates mutagenesis in hepatitis C virus.

RNA viruses
Ribavirin's amide group can make the native nucleoside drug resemble adenosine or guanosine, depending on its rotation. For this reason, when ribavirin is incorporated into RNA, as a base analog of either adenine or guanine, it pairs equally well with either uracil or cytosine, inducing mutations in RNA-dependent replication in RNA viruses. Such hypermutation can be lethal to RNA viruses.

DNA viruses
Neither of these mechanisms explains ribavirin's effect on many DNA viruses, which is more of a mystery, especially given the complete inactivity of ribavirin's 2' deoxyribose analogue, which suggests that the drug functions only as an RNA nucleoside mimic, and never a DNA nucleoside mimic. Ribavirin 5'-monophosphate inhibits cellular inosine monophosphate dehydrogenase, thereby depleting intracellular pools of GTP.

History
Ribavirin was first made in 1972 under the national cancer institute's Virus-Cancer program. This was done by researchers from International Chemical and Nuclear Corporation including Roberts A. Smith, Joseph T. Witkovski and Roland K. Robins. It was reported that ribavirin was active against a variety of RNA and DNA viruses in culture and in animals, without undue toxicity in the context of cancer chemotherapies. By the late 1970s, the Virus-Cancer program was widely considered a failure, and the drug development was abandoned.

Names
Ribavirin is the INN and USAN, whereas tribavirin is the BAN. Brand names of generic forms include Copegus, Ribasphere, Rebetol.

Derivatives
Ribavirin is possibly best viewed as a ribosyl purine analogue with an incomplete purine 6-membered ring. This structural resemblance historically prompted replacement of the 2' nitrogen of the triazole with a carbon (which becomes the 5' carbon in an imidazole), in an attempt to partly "fill out" the second ring--- but to no great effect. Such 5' imidazole riboside derivatives show antiviral activity with 5' hydrogen or halide, but the larger the substituent, the smaller the activity, and all proved less active than ribavirin. Note that two natural products were already known with this imidazole riboside structure: substitution at the 5' carbon with OH results in pyrazofurin, an antibiotic with antiviral properties but unacceptable toxicity, and replacement with an amino group results in the natural purine synthetic precursor 5-aminoimidazole-4-carboxamide-1-β-D-ribofuranoside (AICAR), which has only modest antiviral properties.

Taribavirin

The most successful ribavirin derivative to date is the 3-carboxamidine derivative of the parent 3-carboxamide, first reported in 1973 by J. T. Witkowski et al., and now called taribavirin (former names "viramidine" and "ribamidine"). This drug shows a similar spectrum of antiviral activity to ribavirin, which is not surprising as it is now known to be a pro-drug for ribavirin. Taribavirin, however, has useful properties of less erythrocyte-trapping and better liver-targeting than ribavirin. The first property is due to taribavirin's basic amidine group which inhibits drug entry into RBCs, and the second property is probably due to increased concentration of the enzymes which convert amidine to amide in liver tissue. Taribavirin completed phase III human trials in 2012.

References

External links 
 

Anti–RNA virus drugs
Triazoles
Merck & Co. brands
World Health Organization essential medicines
Virucides
Anti–hepatitis C agents
Wikipedia medicine articles ready to translate